Events from the year 1778 in Canada.

Incumbents
Monarch: George III

Governors
Governor of the Province of Quebec: Guy Carleton
Governor of Nova Scotia: Lord William Campbell
Commodore-Governor of Newfoundland: John Byron
Governor of St. John's Island: Walter Patterson

Events
 March 29 – April 26 British Captain James Cook explores Alaskan coast, seeking Northwest Passage back to the Atlantic. On the last of three voyages to the west coast, he travels as far north as the Bering Strait and claims Nootka Sound, Vancouver Island for the British. While there, he trades for sea otter pelts.  On the way back to England his crew almost mutinied, desperately wanting to go back to the Pacific Northwest, after stopping in China and discovering how much sea otter pelts were worth.
 The American colonies ally with France.
 The English overrun the southern states, but are weakened by a French blockade of shipping.
 After landing at Nootka Sound in August, former British naval captain John Meares arrives from Macao (sailing under the Portuguese flag) with 70 Chinese carpenters. He supervises the building of another ship and housing at Nootka Sound as the post becomes the centre of the pelt and fur trades in the Pacific Northwest. 
 The original form of hockey is explained to pelters by the indigenous and soon after leads to the form of hockey seen today.
 Spinning mule invented to spin multiple strands of yarn.
 First treaty between the United States and an Indian nation is negotiated with the Delaware; they are offered the prospect of statehood 
 British and Iroquois forces attack and massacre American settlers in western New York and Pennsylvania.

Births
April 12 – John Strachan, first Anglican Bishop of Toronto, Born in Aberdeen, Scotland (d.1867)

Full date unknown
David Willson, religious leader and mystic (d.1866)

Historical documents

American Revolutionary War

"War seems to them an expedient measure, and[...]a treaty with the rebels is forming" - Britain suspects France will ally with U.S.A.

French and U.S. diplomats sign treaty that guarantees two nations will make "common cause" against enemy if France goes to war with Britain

Congress's Board of War instructs Lafayette to capture Montreal and either attach Canada to U.S. if Canadians agree to it or retreat if they don't

Report requested by Washington details possible routes, timing, and provision sources for invasion of Canada

Congress approves certain preparations (laying up provisions, preparing clothing) for invasion of Canada

Congress sends Benjamin Franklin at Versailles highly detailed attack plan to link U.S. troops coming from Lake Ontario with French from Quebec City

With "a prospect of our wants and our weaknesses," Washington argues at great length against Congress's plan for U.S. and France to invade Canada

Intelligence report from Vermont says Canadians "very Much In favour" of U.S. cause and their "Preists mouths are Shut" on U.S. dispute with Britain

"Too much in the field of conjecture" - In letter to Maj. Gen. Schuyler, Washington weighs pros, cons and unknowns of invading Canada

Washington to recruit "a Body of four hundred Indians" and believes Oneidas, who have "the strongest Attachment to us[,] will be most numerous"

Intelligence report from New Hampshire says "Joseph Louie the Chief of Saint Francois Tribe" claims all are willing to join United States

Letter with enclosures alerts Washington to security problems in New York, especially with Cherry Valley massacre (Note: "savages" used)

Senecas' "predatory war" in New York makes them chief enemy of U.S. among Haudenosaunee, though Joseph Brant also cited (Note: "savages" used)

Molly Brant writes she has few details of Joseph's "brush with the Rebels," and her hope is soon to "return to our habitations on the Mohawk River"

Sergeant from 8th (King's) Regiment "with a party of Indians from Detroit" take five Pennsylvania riflemen, who are "conducted safe to this city"

Though situation unlike that of previous war, Maj. Gen. Schuyler argues at length usefulness of Lake Ontario route for fighting British in Canada

Canada

"The government of Quebec is a legal parliamentary despotism" - Governor and any "nine of the most profligate persons" can rule (Note: "savage" used)

Gov. Haldimand extends deadline of former Quebec governor Carleton's order to seigneury owners to swear allegiance and register deeds or land rolls

"It is absolutely necessary that the grain be got in dry" - Reader offers method of harvesting in wet weather that avoids grain sprouting

Mulatto woman, 28, for sale; has had measles and smallpox; can cook and keep house, "work at her needle, and is remarkably careful of young children"

Enslaved mulatto girl Bell is sold to Quebec lieutenant governor after twice escaping her Quebec City owner

Montreal merchants offer $8 reward for capture of "Negro man named Jack" who has "Guinea accent" and "was lately purchased of Captain Covells"

Small howitzer shell left on Handsel Monday wounds Margaret Callender's hands and eyes, for which she asks customers' and suppliers' consideration

New husband's misogeny toward letter writer and his friends' "Attachment to the Bottle" leave her doleful and "terrified to death" for his welfare

School to open with instruction in reading, writing, arithmetic, bookkeeping, four languages etc., with emphasis on "exterior deportment and behavior"

Quebec City stay-maker advertises products, skills, and knowledge of "the most early and newest fashions"

Nova Scotia

"Province will be an object of the first consideration to the French" - Anticipating war with France, troops added to 2,800 infantrymen in Nova Scotia

Treaty made on Saint John River by Superintendant of Indians Francklin and Wolastoqiyik, Passamaquoddy and Mi'kmaq, who warn off Machias raiders

Nova Scotia Council thanks Maj. Gen. Massey for defence of province, improving Halifax defences and erecting "important post" on Saint John River

Taken to Boston by privateers, Benjamin Marston is re-imprisoned after brief house arrest, but learns "that a man may enjoy himself in prison"

"Inhuman and cruel; poor miserable sick; suffered and died" - Remarks from account of mistreatment of imprisoned U.S. privateers in Halifax in 1777

British deserter gives much useful information to U.S. commander in New York on naval and military comings and goings, mostly in Halifax

Edward Winslow feels "noble indignation" seeing "scoundrels" who persecute loyalists in committees, Congress and "places confidential & lucrative"

Late Margaret Green "was so mortified to the Vanities[...]as to have little or no Relish of[...]Amusements[,] Pastimes, and useless frothy Entertainments"

Prince Edward Island

Accused fraudster from Canada is questioned in Charlottetown and released on his parole for lack of evidence plus his depositing "295 clipt half Joes"

Map: St. John's Island, northern Acadia and southern Gulf of St. Lawrence

Newfoundland

Irish success in Newfoundland fishery "has raised such a spirit amongst them, that it is said" twice as many ships will sail from Waterford this year

Labrador

Privateers out of Boston, aided by Labrador locals ("traitors"), plunder £14,000-worth from George Cartwright's properties and take his Inuit servants

"The finest sport that man ever had" - Cartwright hunts bears hunting salmon at rapids, pools and beautiful cascade on Eagle River, Labrador

After Cartwright slaps Inuk servant Tweegock "for some sluttish and dirty tricks," he stops her from completing attempts to stab herself in heart

Elsewhere

Open Hudson's Bay Company trade to public because Indigenous people accept low-quality goods and supply skins used in wares for foreign trade

Map segment of former New France from Moose Factory on James Bay to Mississauga territory on Lake Huron

James Cook's Pacific expedition is in Nootka Sound, where trade with locals is conducted with "harmony and integrity," but human parts are "horrid"

Indigenous people's "ingenious[...]manufactures and mechanic arts" are quite unexpected, given "what little progress they have made in civilization"

Illustrations: "Drawings by John Webber of Natives of the Northwest Coast of America" (1778) include people on Nootka Sound

Etc.

Song: "Barrett's Privateers" has unfamiliar lyrics like "letter of marque," "list to port," "scuppers," "loose in stays," "two cables," "main truck"

References 

 
Canada
78